Sinner or Saint may refer to:

 Sinner or Saint (film), a 1923 American silent film
 Sinner or Saint (TV series), a 2011 Philippine television drama series